Visualízate (Spanish for "Visualize Yourself", imperative of reflexive verb "visualizarse") is the third studio album by Cuban reggaeton group Gente de Zona. It was released on April 22, 2016, by Sony Music Latin and Magnus Media LLC. The album features guest appearances from Marc Anthony, Pitbull, Motiff, A&M, Los Cadillacs and Chino y Nacho. The album was supported by two singles: "La Gozadera" and "Traidora". Visualízate has won a Latin Grammy for Best Tropical Fusion Album and was awarded Favorite Tropical Album during the Latin American Music Awards of 2016.

Track listing

Charts

Weekly charts

Year-end charts

Certifications

Awards and nominations

References

2016 albums
Gente De Zona albums
Sony Music Latin albums
Spanish-language albums
Latin Grammy Award for Best Tropical Fusion Album